Small Town Pistols were a Canadian country music duo composed of Amanda and Tyler Wilkinson, formerly of The Wilkinsons.

The two siblings were each pursuing individual solo careers when they both went through difficult break-ups. That led them to start writing music together again with an eye towards pitching songs to other artists including Lady Antebellum. On listening to their new material they decided to perform it themselves. While they did discuss using the Wilkinson name for their new material, they decided to use a fresh name. The name Small Town Pistols is a reference to their having been "raised in a small town of like 14,000 people" while the Pistols is a reference to their grandmother Ida.

Their self-titled debut album was released by 604 Records on February 19, 2013. Its second single, "Living on the Outside," debuted on the Canadian Hot 100 in January 2013.

Discography

Studio albums

Singles

Music videos

Awards and nominations

References

Canadian country music groups
Country music duos
Musical groups established in 2012
Musical groups from Ontario
Canadian musical duos
2012 establishments in Ontario
Canadian Country Music Association Group or Duo of the Year winners